The 2013–14 National League 2 North was the fourth season (27th overall) of the fourth tier (north) of the English domestic rugby union competitions since the professionalised format of the second division was introduced.  The league system was 4 points for a win, 2 points for a draw and additional bonus points being awarded for scoring 4 or more tries and/or losing within 7 points of the victorious team. In terms of promotion the league champions would go straight up into National League 1 while the runners up would have a one-game playoff against the runners up from National League 2 South (at the home ground of the club with the superior league record) for the final promotion place.

The battle for the league title was as tight as it had ever been in the division with three teams - Darlington Mowden Park, Macclesfield and Stourbridge - looking to go up in a title race that went to the very last day of the season.  Stourbridge won their final game away to Harrogate via a bonus point victory meaning that the winner of Darlington Mowden Park and Macclesfield was likely to go up.  In a very close game in front of a record National 2 North crowd of 3,750 at The Northern Echo Arena, Mowden Park emerged as the victors 28 - 24 against Macclesfield only for the Cheshire side to gain 2 bonus points in defeat.  These bonus points meant that it was Macclesfield that went up 1 point clear of their two title rivals, returning to their former league after just one season out.  Despite the disappointment of losing out on the last day of the season, Darlington Mowden Park would follow Macclesfield up into the 2013–14 National League 1 by defeating Ampthill in the north-south promotion playoff in what was a very tight game that took extra time to be resolved.  The move to The Northern Echo Arena saw quite a turnaround in fortunes for the north-east side, with large crowds turning up on a regular basis (an average of over 800 per game) particularly when considering that games held at the old ground of Yiewsley Drive a couple of seasons previously saw only around 200 hardcore fans watching games.  You have to spare a thought for Stourbridge though, as the Midlands side would easily have achieved promotion on any other season but for the most competitive title battle in the divisions recent history.

While the fight for promotion had been extremely fierce the battle for relegation was far less so. Dudley Kingswinford ended a two-year stay in the division in what was a very poor season, failing to win any games at all and only having 6 points all season from try and losing bonuses (they were the first team to lose all 30 games in the division since Manchester in 2010-11, although bonus points gave them a better overall record).  Dudley Kingswinford would be followed in relegation by fellow Midlands side Bromsgrove whose 5 wins were not enough and finally by Sheffield Tigers who did better but not enough to catch 13th placed Hull.  Dudley Kingswinford and Bromsgrove would drop to National League 3 Midlands while Sheffield Tigers fell to National League 3 North.

Participating teams and locations

Twelve of the teams listed below participated in the 2012–13 National League 2 North season. Macclesfield and Sedgley Park were relegated from the 2012–13 National League 1; Chester (champions) and Harrogate (playoffs) were promoted from National League 3 North; Ampthill were promoted from National League 3 Midlands as champions and were then level transferred to the 2013–14 National League 2 South, due to an imbalance in the number of teams in the two fourth tier leagues.

League table

Results

Round 1

Round 2

Round 3

Round 4

Round 5

Round 6

Round 7

Round 8

Round 9

Round 10

Round 11

Round 12

Round 13

Round 14

Round 15

Round 16

Round 17

Round 18

Round 19

Round 20 

Postponed.  Game rescheduled to 22 February 2014.

Round 21 

Postponed.  Game rescheduled to 22 February 2014.

Postponed.  Game rescheduled to 22 February 2014.

Postponed.  Game rescheduled to 22 February 2014.

Round 22 

Postponed.  Game rescheduled to 15 March 2014.

Postponed.  Game rescheduled to 15 March 2014.

Round 23 

Postponed.  Game rescheduled to 19 April 2014.

Postponed.  Game rescheduled to 15 March 2014.

Postponed.  Game rescheduled to 19 April 2014.

Postponed.  Game rescheduled to 19 April 2014.

Rounds 20 & 21 (rescheduled games) 

Game rescheduled from 1 February 2014.

Game rescheduled from 1 February 2014.

Game rescheduled from 1 February 2014.

Game rescheduled from 25 January 2014.

Round 24

Round 25

Rounds 22 & 23 

Game rescheduled from 15 February 2014.

Game rescheduled from 8 February 2014.

Game rescheduled from 8 February 2014.

Round 26

Round 27

Round 28

Round 29

Round 23 (rescheduled games) 

Game rescheduled from 15 February 2014.

Game rescheduled from 15 February 2014.

Game rescheduled from 15 February 2014.

Round 30

Promotion play–off
Each season, the runners–up in the National League 2 South and National League 2 North participate in a play–off for promotion into National Division 1. Darlington Mowden Park were runners-up in the North and as they had a better record than the 2013–14 National League 2 South runners-up, Ampthill, they hosted the play–off match.  The game was played on 3 May 2014 at The Northern Echo Arena and finished 25 – 25 after normal time, so went to two 10-minute periods of extra time. The game was won with a try scored by DMP in the 3rd minute of added on time. As a result, they will play in National League 1 in the 2014–15 season for the first time.

Total season attendances 
Figures not including north-south promotion playoff.

Individual statistics 

 Note that points scorers includes tries as well as conversions, penalties and drop goals.

Top points scorers

Top try scorers

Season records

Team
Largest home win — 96 pts 
111 - 15 Sedgley Park at home to Dudley Kingswinford on 7 December 2013
Largest away win — 74 pts
74 - 0 Leicester Lions away to Dudley Kingswinford on 26 April 2014
Most points scored — 111 pts 
111 - 15 Sedgley Park at home to Dudley Kingswinford on 7 December 2013
Most tries in a match — 17
Sedgley Park at home to Dudley Kingswinford on 7 December 2013
Most conversions in a match — 13
Sedgley Park at home to Dudley Kingswinford on 7 December 2013
Most penalties in a match — 6 (x2)
Otley away to Sedgley Park on 26 October 2013
Leicester Lions away to Caldy on 4 January 2014
Most drop goals in a match — 2
Birmingham & Solihull away to Luctonians on 5 October 2013

Player
Most points in a match — 35
 Stephen Collins for Sedgley Park at home to Dudley Kingswinford on 7 December 2013
Most tries in a match — 5 (x2)
 Matthew Lamprey for Sedgley Park at home to Dudley Kingswinford on 7 December 2013
 Nathan Bressington for Stourbridge at home to Bromsgrove on 12 April 2014
Most conversions in a match — 13
 Stephen Collins for Sedgley Park at home to Dudley Kingswinford on 7 December 2013
Most penalties in a match — 6 (x2)
 Mark Ireland for Otley away to Sedgley Park on 26 October 2013
 Jon Boden for Leicester Lions away to Caldy on 4 January 2014
Most drop goals in a match — 2
 Adam Canning for Birmingham & Solihull away to Luctonians on 5 October 2013

Attendances
Highest — 3,750 
Darlington Mowden Park at home to Macclesfield on 26 April 2014
Lowest — 90 
Hull at home to Otley on 14 December 2013
Highest Average Attendance — 913
Darlington Mowden Park
Lowest Average Attendance — 122
Leicester Lions

See also
 English Rugby Union Leagues
 English rugby union system
 Rugby union in England

References

External links
 NCA Rugby

2013-14
2013–14 in English rugby union leagues